Nicola Marconi (born 12 November 1978) is an Italian diver.

He was born in Rome. At the 2000 Olympic Games he finished 26th in the 3 metre springboard event and eighth together with Donald Miranda in the synchronized 3 metre springboard event. He later finished 20th in the 3 metre springboard event of the 2004 Olympic Games and 14th in the 3 metre springboard event of the 2008 Olympic Games.

He is a brother of Maria Marconi and Tommaso Marconi.

References

1978 births
Living people
Italian male divers
Divers at the 2000 Summer Olympics
Divers at the 2004 Summer Olympics
Divers at the 2008 Summer Olympics
Olympic divers of Italy
Divers from Rome